Brevoort Houses, or Brevoort Projects, are a housing project located in the Bedford-Stuyvestant neighborhood in Brooklyn, New York. The complex is made up of 13 seven-story buildings with 896 apartments. The complex sits on 17.26-acres and construction was completed on August 31, 1955. It is owned and managed by New York City Housing Authority.  

The development is located between Bainbridge and Fulton Streets and Ralph and Patchen Avenues. The closest subway lines include the "C" at Ralph Avenue, as well as the "A" and "C" at Utica Avenue.

Notable residents 

 Fabolous (born 1977), rapper

See also 

 New York City Housing Authority
 List of New York City Housing Authority properties

References

Residential buildings in Brooklyn
Residential buildings completed in 1955
Bedford–Stuyvesant, Brooklyn
Public housing in Brooklyn
1955 establishments in New York City